Yang Yongjian (born April 28, 1973) is a male Chinese race walker.

Achievements

References

1973 births
Living people
Athletes (track and field) at the 2000 Summer Olympics
Chinese male racewalkers
Olympic athletes of China